El Remedio is one of six parishes (administrative divisions) in Nava, a municipality within the province and autonomous community of Asturias, in northern Spain.

Villages

Parishes in Nava